John Olsen Lear (December 3, 1942 – March 29, 2022), son of Learjet magnate Bill Lear, was an aviator who set multiple records, later flying cargo planes for the CIA during the Vietnam era.  

In the 1980s, Lear began espousing conspiracy theories of alien collusion with secret governmental forces.  In the second half of the 1980s, Lear was "probably the most influential source" of UFO conspiracy theories.

Early life
John Olsen Lear was born on December 3, 1942, to industrialist and future Learjet founder Bill Lear and his wife Moya Marie Olsen Lear.   He was named after his maternal grandfather, famous comedian John Olsen.  His second and third birthday parties were covered in the "Society" page of an Ohio paper.

Lear graduated from the Institut Le Rosey boarding school in Switzerland and attended Wichita State University.

Aviator career
In 1956, Lear flew his first flight at age 14. His first solo flight was at 16, and in 1960, Lear was hired as a pilot and public relationship representative by his father's company. In 1962, Lear crashed a biplane during stunt flying at his boarding school;  He underwent an emergency tracheotomy, a five hour surgery, and a long convalescence.   

That year, Lear agreed to attend a Pasadena, California Art College, but lost the $5,000 he had been given for tuition in the stock market.  Lear and his father remain estranged -- when his father died in 1979, John Lear was excluded from the will, which was generous to John's children.     

In 1965, Lear was employed by the Paul Kelly Flying Service when its founder was killed while piloting a LearJet. Lear testified at the Civil Aeronautics Board investigation into the crash.

Between May 23 and 26, 1966, Lear and a crewmate flew a record-breaking flight around the world in a LearJet that covered 22,000 miles in 50 hours and 39 minutes. In August 1966, Lear was featured in the Wichita Press after he piloted a LearJet carrying the rock band The Byrds and the trip inspired them to write a song about the plane. The track, titled "2-4-2 Foxtrot (The Lear Jet Song)", samples Lear's voice as he speaks over the radio.

In 1968, Air Force personnel from Hamilton Air Force Base launched a rescue effort to help Lear land after heavy San Francisco fog interfered with landing.   Traffic was cleared from the Golden Gate Bridge in anticipation of a forced landing.  After a helicopter pilot established visual contact, Lear was able to successfully land at the base.

Lear flew planes for the CIA between 1967 and 1983.

In 1980, Lear was covered in local press when he lost a billing dispute with his natural gas provider.  That November, Lear ran for Nevada State Senate, earning the endorsement of a "Coalition for Affordable Energy".

Influence on UFO conspiracy theories
Lear has been described as "a divisive figure whose claims often crumbled under scrutiny."

UFO conspiracy theories before Lear
Since the 1947 flying disc craze,  Americans had reported seeing unidentified objects in the skies, and by 1955, UFO researchers were accusing the US Government of a cover-up.  In the 1950s and 60s, many UFO and  contactee groups professed belief in Space Brothers, benevolent aliens eager to improve life on Earth. During a 1964 hypnotic regression, Barney Hill became the first person to report recollections of Gray Aliens and Alien Abductions.  By 1973, UFO mythology told of a UFO landing at Holloman Air Force Base;  A 'strikingly similar' landing served as the climax to 1977's blockbuster Close Encounters of the Third Kind.   By 1978, UFO mythology included a crashed flying saucer near Roswell.  In 1980, cattle mutilations near Dulce, New Mexico were linked to UFOs in popular media.   

 MJ-12
In 1984,  Bill Moore's partner Jaime Shandera received an envelope containing film which, when developed, showed images of eight pages of documents that appeared to be briefing papers describing "Operation Majestic 12", a top-level UFO group with the US Government.

Bennewitz disinfo campaign

Statement by John Lear

On December 29, 1987, Lear posted a Statement to ParaNet, an early bulletin board system dedicated to the paranormal, claiming that the US government has close contacts with extraterrestrials and were secretly "promoting" films like E.T.: The Extra-Terrestrial and Close Encounters of the Third Kind to influence the public to see extraterrestrials as "space brothers".  
The document was  revised on January 14, again in March, with a final revision dated August 25, 1988.  The document describing a secret government committee, Majestic 12, making a treaty with Gray aliens, only to later realize they've been deceived by the aliens.

The Statement claims a UFO coverup has been underway for 40 years.   Lear argues that "Germany may have recovered a flying saucer in 1939" and discusses the 1946 American military investigation into the Ghost rockets reported over Sweden.    
The Statement argues that many in the "original group" of insiders committed suicide, most notably James Forrestal.  According to the narrative, Truman formed a group of twelve insiders, known as Majestic 12, to investigate the matter.  
The Statement lists three saucer crashes: one near Roswell.  another near Aztec, New Mexico and a third near Laredo, Texas.  According to the Statement, the US government covered a "total, thorough and sweeping cover-up to include the use of 'deadly force.'"

The Statement references the 1952 Washington, D.C., UFO incident and a 1964 meeting with aliens at Holloman Air Force Base.  Lear's Statement includes government-sanctioned alien abductions, alien implants, and Alien-Human hybrids.   The Statement asserts that "some of the nations missing children had been used for secretions and other parts required by the aliens".  Lear described UFOs in connect with cattle mutilations and even claims that human mutilations have occurred.  Lear talks about Dulce Base and an altercation between aliens and the US military that led to 66 human casulaties.    

Mirage Men author Mark Pilkington later described Lear's Statement as "a perfect synthesis of the Aquarius and MJ-12 disinformation and the chthonic [subterranean], paranoiac horrors of Paul Bennewitz."
On January 28, 1988, Lear was interviewed by TV journalist George Knapp.

Relationship with Bill Cooper

Lear had been posting "wild conspiracies about secret government relations with aliens" to Paranet.  The New Republic argues Lear's theories were "the kind of thing no one took very seriously".  That changed in the Summer of 1988,  when UFO witness Bill Cooper made his first public comments on the ParaNet Bulletin Board System.  According to Cooper's first post, in 1966 he was serving aboard the USS Tiru when he and fellow Navy personnel witnessed a metal craft "larger than a football field" repeatedly enter and exit the water. Cooper claimed he was instructed by superiors to never speak about the incident.

Biographer Mark Jacobson argues "the Tiru incident itself would not have done much to make Cooper’s name in ufology. That opportunity came only a few days later" when he was contacted by fellow ParaNet poster John Olsen Lear.  The two began a collaboration.

In 1989, the pair issued an "indictment" demanding that the US "cease aiding and abetting and concealing this Alien Nation which exists in our borders."

Introduction of Bob Lazar and Area 51

In March 1989, Lear journeyed to the outskirts of "Area 51".
Lear introduced journalist George Knapp to UFO whistle-blower Bob Lazar and his tales of Area 51.
On May 15, 1989,  KLAS-TV broadcast a live interview between George Knapp and a man clad in shadow and using the pseudonym "Dennis".  The following November, Lazar again appeared, this time unmasked and under his own name.

Lazar's claims were widely discredited. His supposed employment at a Nellis Air Force Base subsidiary has also been discredited by skeptics, as well as by the United States Air Force.

Role in 1989 symposium

In 1989, Lear served as State Director for The Mutual UFO Network, hosting   their 1989 annual convention in Las Vegas, Nevada, on July 1, 1989. The symposium was titled:   "The UFO Cover-Up: A Government Conspiracy?"   Despite initial objections from MUFON founder Walt Andrus, Lear was able to submit a slate of speakers after he threatened to split the symposium.  Lear's speakers were slated to provide allegedly-independent verification of the Bennewitz claims.  One of those speakers, Bill Cooper, would later break with Lear after accusing him of being an intelligence agent.

The Ufologist Bill Moore was scheduled as the main speaker, and he refused to submit his paper for review prior to the convention, and also announced that he would not answer any follow-up questions as was common practice. Unlike most of the convention's attendees, Moore did not stay at the same hotel that was hosting the convention.

When he spoke, Moore said that he and others had been part of an elaborate, long-term disinformation campaign begun primarily to discredit Paul Bennewitz: "My role in the affair ... was primarily that of a freelancer providing information on Paul's (Bennewitz) current thinking and activities". Air Force Sergeant Richard C. Doty was also involved, said Moore, though Moore thought Doty was "simply a pawn in a much larger game, as was I." One of their goals, Moore said, was to disseminate information and watch as it was passed from person to person in order to study information channels.

Moore said that he "was in a rather unique position" in the disinformation campaign: "judging by the positions of the people I knew to be directly involved in it, [the disinformation] definitely had something to do with national security. There was no way I was going to allow the opportunity to pass me by ... I would play the disinformation game, get my hands dirty just often enough to lead those directing the process into believing I was doing what they wanted me to do, and all the while continuing to burrow my way into the matrix so as to learn as much as possible about who was directing it and why." Once he finished the speech, Moore immediately left the hotel and Las Vegas that same night.

Moore's claims sent shock waves through the small, tight-knit UFO community, which remains divided as to the reliability of his assertions.

Legacy
Lear remained a prominent voice in the UFO conspiracy theory community until his death.  Lear made multiple appearances on TV shows, including Ancient Aliens, America's Book of Secrets,Brad Meltzer's Decoded,  and The Unexplained Files.   From 2003 to 2015, Lear was a regular guest on Coast to Coast AM.

Lear's claims left a lasting influence on the UFO movement—one author observed "in the early years [UFO writers] did not, by and large, embrace strong political positions.  Cooper and Lear  were the tip of a spear asserting that the number one thing we had to fear was not little green men, but the government that colluded with them, appropriating their technology against us."

Personal life and death
In 1970, Lear married Marilee Higginbotham, owner of a California fashion modelling agency, at a ceremony in Pacific Palisades, Los Angeles.

Lear died on March 29, 2022.

References

Notes

1942 births
2022 deaths
American radio personalities
American conspiracy theorists
UFO conspiracy theorists
Wichita State University alumni
Alumni of Institut Le Rosey